Summar is a surname. Notable people with the surname include:

Marshall Summar (born 1959), American physician, clinical geneticist, and academic
Trent Summar, American country music singer, member of Trent Summar & the New Row Mob

See also
Summer (surname)